Tribosphenida is a group (infralegion) of mammals that includes the ancestor of Hypomylos, Aegialodontia and Theria (the last common ancestor of marsupials and placentals plus all of its descendants). Its current definition is more or less synonymous with Boreosphenida.

Characteristics
Tribosphenid mammals were originally grouped on the basis of triangular or V-shaped (tribosphenic) molars. Since then, other unrelated mammal groups have been found to have tribosphenic molars, such as the australosphenidans (a group that includes the still extant monotremes), suggesting that as a synapomorphy this is fundamentally useless as it evolved multiple times among mammals.

However, a clade between the aforementioned groups, the "true Tribosphenida" or Boreosphenida, is still identifiable, united by characteristics such as the lack of a mesial cingulid and of a triangulated trigonid on the last premolar. They are also united by postcranial features such as the presence of a modern ear (though this too has evolved independently in many other groups, like monotremes), modern shoulder blades, and several features of the hindlimb.

Phylogeny
Below is a cladogram from Rowe (1988) and McKenna and Bell (1997) showing one hypothesis of mammal relationships:

Boreosphenida
Boreosphenida (from boreas, "northern wind" and sphen, "wedge") were early mammals that originated in the Northern Hemisphere and had tribosphenic molars (three-cusped cheek teeth). In boreosphenidans, the mandibular angle is placed posteriorly and the primitive postdentary trough (hole in the mandible) is absent (in contrast to Kuehneotheriidae, Eupantotheria, and Australosphenida.)  They share the tribosphenic molars with the Australosphenida but differ from them by having cingulid cuspules but lacking a continuous mesial cingulid.  Boreosphenidans also lack the triangulated trigonid on the last premolar found in Early Cretaceous mammals.  They differ from Shuotherium (a monotreme-relative) in having the talonid placed posterior to the trigonid (like in modern tribosphenic mammals) in the lower molars, but upper molars similar to those of Shuotherium.

The oldest boreosphenidans are from the Berriasian (~145-140 mya).  They were restricted to the Northern Hemisphere during the Early Cretaceous, but spread to South America and India during the end of the Cretaceous.

An alternative hypothesis is offered by Flannery and colleagues, who view all non-monotreme australosphenidans as stem Theria, with Barremian-Aptian Australian Bisphopidae as the sister taxon to all Northern Hemisphere Theria (Boreosphenida).

References

External links
 MESOZOIC MAMMALS; Stem zatherians, zatherians & Peramuridae, an internet directory
 THERIA И MARSUPIONTA (in Russian)
 Infralegion Tribosphenida - Hierarchy - The Taxonomicon

 
Mammal taxonomy